Fort King (also known as Camp King or Cantonment King) was a United States military fort in north central Florida, near what later developed as the city of Ocala. It was named after Colonel William King, commander of Florida's Fourth Infantry and the first governor of the provisional West Florida region.

The fort was built in 1827 during United States tensions with the Seminole in Florida, a tribe of mostly Creek people who formed in the early nineteenth century. Originally established to serve as a buffer between new settlers and the Seminole, the fort became an important base in the 1830s for the United States Army during removal of the Seminole and the Seminole Wars. It later served as a courthouse in 1844 after the organization of Marion County, but was eventually abandoned altogether. Residents took it apart to salvage building materials. The site of the fort is preserved as a National Historic Landmark near the corner of East Fort King Street and 39th Avenue in Ocala. In late 2017, the fort was newly reconstructed to be as historically accurate as possible.

Archeological investigation has revealed the site was occupied during two lengthy periods by varying cultures of indigenous peoples, beginning as early as 6500 BC, more than 8,000 years ago.

History

Just east of the heart of present-day Ocala, is a hill. A very special hill (subjective), stained with the blood of fallen soldiers and Indians during America's longest and most expensive Indian war. The hill, with its nearby spring still flowing today, is a hill of such historic significance to our nation, that Congress and the Secretary of the Department of Interior designated it a National Historic Landmark on February 24, 2004. The history begins with the sounds of soldiers and wagons making their way through the nearby forests in search of a site to build a fort. The year was 1827. It would be the same type of picket fort constructed by George Washington at Fort Necessity in 1754. It would be like Fort Leavenworth in Kansas, Fort Still in Oklahoma, and Fort Laramie in Wyoming. Just as many forts became America's cities, like Fort Pontchartrain becoming Detroit, Fort Dearborn becoming Chicago, and Fort Pitt becoming Pittsburgh, this fort was destined to become Ocala. As trees fell and construction began, the fort would be named in honor of Colonel William King, commander of the Fourth Infantry. It was constructed to administrate the treaty of Moultrie Creek, which relocated Seminoles to a large reservation in Central Florida. Fort King was to promote law and order in the wilderness by protecting the Seminoles from trespassing settlers. Fort King, and the nearby Indian Agency, were viewed positively by the Seminoles. As the recession of 1829 worsened, the Army abandoned Fort King due to severe budget cuts. Seminoles were left with no soldiers to protect them, and with reduced subsidies from the government. They could no longer buy corn and other staples. Fort King stood empty for three years (1829-1832), but the Seminoles did not disturb it. Instead, they waited for the return of soldiers to protect them. In May 1832, Andrew Jackson summoned Seminole leaders to Payne's Landing on the Ocklawaha River and forced them to sign a new treaty. One month later, in June 1832, the soldiers returned to Fort King. By this time, instead of protecting the Seminoles, the soldiers ordered their expulsion from Florida, according to the terms of the Treaty of Payne's Landing. Now, instead of a symbol of freedom, hope and justice, Fort King and its soldiers became a symbol of hate and oppression, and it was on this stage that a new Seminole stepped forward. His name was Osceola. Osceola made his first appearance to the world at Fort King in October 1834. The defiant young war chief rejected U.S. orders and threatened war unless the Seminoles were left alone. Tensions continued to rise. Two companies of U.S. regulars, under the command of Major Francis Dade, were dispatched from Fort Brooke in Tampa to reinforce the troops at Fort King. On the morning of December 28, 1835, they were ambushed and annihilated by a band of Seminoles under the leadership of Seminole warrior, Micanopy. That afternoon, Osceola shot and killed Indian agent Wiley Thompson as he stepped out of Fort King for an afternoon walk. The Second Seminole war had begun. During the seven-year war that followed, every major general and Regiment of the U.S. Army were either stationed at or passed through the gates of Fort King. Notable generals like Gaines, Scott, Clinch, Jessup, Taylor, and Armistead, along with junior officers like Worth, Johnson, Prince, Bragg, Mead, and Pemberton would all see duty there. Yet with all of that might, the U.S. Army could not win the guerrilla type warfare of the Seminoles. Finally U.S. forces began to withdraw, and in May 1836, Fort King was once again abandoned. This time it was burned to the ground by the victorious Seminoles. The victory, however, was short-lived. One year later in 1837, the U.S. Army returned and the fort was rebuilt. This time the Army of the South would direct dragoon and infantry units in unrelenting "search and destroy" missions against the Seminoles. At the war's end in 1842, most of the Seminoles had been killed or captured and moved to Oklahoma. The Seminoles that were moved to Oklahoma make up the Seminole Nation of today. A small number of "unconquered and defiant" Seminoles withdrew to the vastness of the Florida Everglades and are known today as the Seminole Tribe of Florida. In 1842 with the war ended, Fort King was once again abandoned by the troops and transferred to the people of Marion County. The Fort then became the county's first courthouse and public building. In 1846, it was dismantled for its lumber, and the courthouse moved into the new city of Ocala. Fort King is the link to our past and our future. Standing on the hilltop, Fort King puts us in the very footsteps of the Indians and soldiers that roamed our City and County before we arrived. It is how we got here, it is our story, and, in our very midst, it is the exact spot where it all happened.

Prehistory
Archaeological investigations have revealed that the area was inhabited long before the arrival of the Spanish in the area. At least two periods of occupation have been identified: between 6500 and 2000 B.C., and 200 to 1500 A.D.

Recent History

The fort

Fort King was constructed by the United States Army in 1827 to serve as a buffer between the Seminole (who occupied territory to the south according to the Moultrie Creek Treaty reservation area) and European Americans settling north of this point. It was located at the nexus of a system of military roads. From the fort, Fort King Road led to Fort Brooks (near Orange Springs); Fort McCoy; a ford at the St. Johns River which would become the town of Astor; Palatka, Jacksonville, and Fort Brooke (on Tampa Bay), among others. The fort fell into disuse after 1829.

In 1832, the fort was activated as a base for the United States removal of the Seminole to Indian Territory west of the Mississippi River, as part of the Treaty of Payne's Landing. The Second Seminole War, beginning in late 1835 in central Florida, heightened the importance of the fort. It was a center of United States military activity during the next seven years, due to its strategic location. The Seminole burned the original Fort King down in 1835, a second Fort King was reconstructed in the same spot in 1836 (this is the replica that is now built on site). 
After the organization of Marion County, the fort was used in 1844 as its first courthouse. Eventually, the building was abandoned. Early residents thoroughly took apart the fort to salvage building materials.

20th century to today

The 1953 movie Seminole is set around Fort King, although the events portrayed are historically inaccurate. In the fall of 2017 a replica of the fort was reconstructed on the original site; the site is 37 acres of undeveloped, vacant land in the middle of a residential area. The site is owned by the City of Ocala and Marion County. Three historical markers commemorate the site: a Memorial Marker near the Fort Site, a National Historic Landmark near the former location of the fort (it was designated in February 2004), and a marker at the old Fort Cemetery Site. In October 1927, the founding members of the Ocala Chapter National Society Daughters of the American Revolution purchased the fort's memorial property, vowing to promote and protect its history for future generations. They raised the funds to erect a granite monument on the property to honor the men who bravely served our state and country here.  On August 26, 2017, the Ocala Chapter National Society Daughters of the American Revolution continued the tradition by hosting a remembrance and dedication ceremony at the Fort King property and a granite bench was dedicated.
In 2013 the Fort King Heritage Association was formed to develop, promote and protect the site. In September 2020, Seminole members announced a reconstruction process. It is believed to cost about 14.1 million dollars.

References

External links

 About Marion County at Marion County Board of County Commissioners
 Ocala, at Ocala, Marion County Chamber of Commerce
 Ocala Star Banner, official website
 "Archaeologists digging up Fort King's past", Ocala Star Banner, 1 January 2003
 "Fort King built to keep Whites and Seminoles from fighting", Ocala Star Banner, 1 January 2003
 "Marion County History's Silent Sentinel - Fort King", Ocala Star Banner, 1 January 2003
 "70 Years later, Fort King Marker rededicated", Ocala Star Banner, 1 January 2003
 "Florida's 'Crossroads' ", Ocala Star Banner, 1 January 2003
 "Fort King site selected for national protection", Ocala Star Banner, 1 January 2003
 Marion County, Part 2 - Fort King and Fort Drane at The Florida Seminole War 1792-1859
 Florida Forts at American Forts Network
 http://www.ocala.com/news/20171128/fort-king-reconstructed
 Florida Seminole Wars Heritage Trail.

Archaeological sites in Florida
King
National Historic Landmarks in Florida
Buildings and structures in Ocala, Florida
National Register of Historic Places in Marion County, Florida
King
Pre-statehood history of Florida
Former populated places in Florida
Former populated places in Marion County, Florida
Former county seats in Florida
1827 establishments in Florida Territory
Daughters of the American Revolution
Second Seminole War fortifications